Huayangosauridae (derived from Huayangosaurus, "Huayang Guo Zhi reptile") is a family of stegosaurian dinosaurs from the Jurassic of China. The group is defined as all taxa closer to the namesake genus Huayangosaurus than Stegosaurus, and was originally named as the family Huayangosaurinae by Zhiming Dong and colleagues in the description of Huayangosaurus. Huayangosaurinae, known from the Middle Jurassic of the Shaximiao Formation, was proposed to be intermediate between Scelidosaurinae and Stegosaurinae, suggesting that the origins of stegosaurs lay in Asia. Following phylogenetic analyses, Huayangosauridae was expanded to also include the taxon Chungkingosaurus, known from specimens from younger Late Jurassic deposits of the Shaximiao Formation. Huayangosauridae is either the sister taxon to all other stegosaurs, or close to the origin of the clade, with taxa like Gigantspinosaurus or Isaberrysaura outside the Stegosauridae-Huayangosauridae split. Huayangosauridae was formally defined in 2021 by Daniel Madzia and colleagues, who used the previous definitions of all taxa closer to Huayangosaurus taibaii than Stegosaurus stenops, and chose the 2020 phylogeny of Susannah Maidment et al. to illustrate the relationships of the clade:

References

Stegosaurs
Jurassic dinosaurs
Prehistoric dinosaur families